The Despreux River is a tributary of the Harricana River, flowing into the municipalities of Eeyou Istchee Baie-James (municipality), in Jamésie, in the administrative region from Nord-du-Québec, in Quebec, in Canada.

The surface of the river is usually frozen from early November to mid-May, however, safe ice movement is generally from mid-November to the end of April.

Geography 
The main hydrographic slopes near the Despreux River are:
North side: Breynat River, Harricana River, Joncas River;
East side: Harricana River, Joncas River;
South side: Turgeon River (Eeyou Istchee James Bay), Martigny River;
West side: Breynat River, Malouin River, Mannerelle River.

The Despreux River derives its source from a forest stream, located in the municipality of Eeyou Istchee James Bay (municipality).

The source of the Despreux River located at:
 West of the Harricana River;
 East of the source of the Malouin River;
 East of the Ontario border.

From the source, the Despreux River flows over  according to the following segments:
 north, to the dump (coming from the South-East) of Lake Despreux;
 to the North, to a creek (coming from the South);
 northeasterly to mouth.

The Despreux River flows on the west bank of the Harricana River across the Island of Seven Mile, to:
 South-East of the mouth of the Harricana River;
 East of the Ontario border;
 North-West of downtown Matagami, Quebec.

Toponymy 
The toponym "Despreux River" was formalized on December 5, 1968, at the Commission de toponymie du Québec, when it was founded.

See also 

List of rivers of Quebec

Notes and references 

Rivers of Nord-du-Québec